Ragins is a surname. Notable people with the surname include:

Ida Kraus Ragins (1894–1985), Russian-born American biochemist
Mark Ragins, American psychiatrist